Elvanie Nimbona (born 15 March 1998) is a Burundian long-distance runner. She competed in the senior women's race at the 2019 IAAF World Cross Country Championships. She finished in 55th place.

In 2017, she competed in the junior women's race at the 2017 IAAF World Cross Country Championships held in Kampala, Uganda. She finished in 16th place.

In 2019, she also competed in the women's marathon at the 2019 World Athletics Championships held in Doha, Qatar. She did not finish her race.

References

External links 
 

Living people
1998 births
Place of birth missing (living people)
Burundian female long-distance runners
Burundian female marathon runners
Burundian female cross country runners
World Athletics Championships athletes for Burundi
21st-century Burundian people